Brachycephaloidea (terrarana) is a monophyletic group of frogs that includes the families: Brachycephalidae, Craugastoridae, Eleutherodactylidae, Ceuthomantidae, and Strabomantidae. The superfamily contains 882 species that inhabit the New World tropics, subtropics, and Andean regions. The group has undergone extensive changes in its taxonomy thanks to multiple molecular phylogenetic analyses in recent years. Until 2008, these species were placed in a single, large family (Brachycephalidae) new analysis from 344 species were used to estimate their relationship. A new taxon was made, terrarana, separating the group into the five families listed above

References 

 
Animal superfamilies